Dawn Rider is a 2012 American Western film starring Christian Slater, Jill Hennessy and Donald Sutherland. It is a remake of the 1935 John Wayne film The Dawn Rider.

Plot
Cincinnati John Mason, who says he has never been to Cincinnati, visits his father in Promise, Wyoming in 1883. His father is not happy to see him, but they do get to spend some time together before the father is killed by a masked gang robbing the mail. Mason's friend Rudd needs $5000 to save his ranch and he doesn't care how he gets it, even putting the ranch before his sister Alice. Mason wants to find this gang because they killed his father, while a bounty hunter named Cochrane is after Mason. One way to attract the gang, and to possibly save Rudd's ranch, is the payroll for railway workers which is being delivered to Promise and must be taken from there to the railroad.

Cast

 Christian Slater as John
 Jill Hennessy as Alice
 Donald Sutherland as Cochrane
 George Canyon as Cattle Jack
 Lochlyn Munro as Rudd
 Ben Cotton as Ben
 Adrian Hough as Sheriff Cobb
 Ken Yanko as Dad Mason

Awards 
The costume design in the film earned Zohra Shahalimi the Leo Award for Best Costume Design for Feature Length Drama.

References

External links
 
 
Nasser Entertainment Production Company Website

2012 films
2012 Western (genre) films
American Western (genre) films
Remakes of American films
Western (genre) film remakes
Films set in Wyoming
2010s English-language films
2010s American films